Infiltrate•Destroy•Rebuild: The Video Album is the first video album by American rock band CKY. Directed by Bam Margera and produced by Joe Frantz, it was released on November 18, 2003 via Island Records. The album features music videos for all ten tracks from the band's second studio album Infiltrate•Destroy•Rebuild, as well as behind-the-scenes features, older music videos and a documentary.

Background
Disc one of Infiltrate•Destroy•Rebuild: The Video Album features music videos and behind the scenes videos for all ten songs on Infiltrate•Destroy•Rebuild, CKY's 2002 second studio album. Additionally, it also features music videos for two older songs, Volume 1 tracks "96 Quite Bitter Beings" and "Disengage the Simulator", as well as a photo gallery.

Disc two features a documentary entitled "CKY: Chopped & Sliced". Running at almost three hours long, the documentary features footage filmed by various people associated with the band, including guitarist Chad I Ginsburg, drummer Jess Margera's brother Bam and photographer Ryan Gee, and is made up of what Jess Margera describes as "tons of behind-the-scenes footage and backstage and tour stuff". Some of the footage is said to have been filmed on the 2003 Out on the Noose Again tour.

All ten music videos were directed by Bam Margera and produced by CKY crew member Joe Frantz, with the exception of "Inhuman Creation Station", which was directed by Dave Denenn (with animation by Rob Shaw). "CKY: Chopped & Sliced" was directed by Ginsburg, with assistance from then-bassist Vernon Zaborowski, and produced by Erin Alexander.

Production
Speaking about the album in a 2003 interview with music reviewer Mark Prindle, Jess Margera explained that the videos on the album were recorded "over about the course of a year and a half", praising his brother's work as director and describing the videos as "insane". He also praised Denenn for his work on "Inhuman Creation Station", claiming that the animation on the video "looks better than [The] Nightmare Before Christmas". Speaking about the production of the video, Margera noted that Denenn produced the video in return for a low rate as he "just [wanted] to make a name for himself", and claimed that he "worked on it every day for 17 hours a day, with him and a crew of about four or five people, for a month and a half straight".

The music videos on the album feature a number of visual themes, but largely consist of performance footage. Themes in the videos include many elements present in the band's music and related projects (such as the CKY video series), including horror (in the form of murder on "Escape from Hellview" and injury on "Shock & Terror") and skateboarding (on "Flesh into Gear" and "Sink into the Underground"). Actress Misty Mundae appears in the "Shock & Terror" video.

Reception
Writing for the website ReadJunk.com, Bryan Kremkau proposed that Infiltrate•Destroy•Rebuild: The Video Album "confirmed the band's visionary instincts", praising Bam Margera's contribution to the album in the form of "professional" and "masterly" editing. Chad Connolly of website The Movies Made Me Do It was similarly positive, awarding the album a rating of ten out of ten and praising elements such as the bonus documentary and behind the scenes videos.

Track listing
All videos directed by Bam Margera, except where noted.

Personnel
Music videos

Deron Miller – performance
Chad I Ginsburg – performance
Jess Margera – performance
Vernon Zaborowski – performance
Bam Margera – film direction, editing
Joe Frantz – production, cinematography, editing
Jim Burt – post-production
Efrain Torres – mixing
Joe Capriglione – filming ("Inhuman Creation Station Behind the Scenes")
Dave Denenn – direction ("Inhuman Creation Station")
Rob Shaw – animation ("Inhuman Creation Station")
R. Scott Purcell – production design ("Inhuman Creation Station")
Monique Ligones – miniatures ("Inhuman Creation Station")

Documentary

Chad I Ginsburg – direction and filming
Vernon Zaborowski – direction assistance and filming
Bam Margera – filming
Bill Whirity – filming
Fritz – filming
Jeremiah "The Cawz" – filming
Joe Frantz – filming
Matt "Matty J" Janaitis – filming
Netti – filming
Ryan Gee – filming
Ryan Spevak – filming
Steve Haegele – filming
Erin Alexander – production
Chris Burkhalter – editing
Nadav Streett – editing
Jina Dierolf – post-production and artwork

Other personnel

Chad I Ginsburg – package design
Jina Dierolf – package design
Adam Wallacavage – photography
Adam Mecchi – online editing

References

External links

CKY (band) albums
2003 video albums
Island Records albums